Pavel Roman (25 January 1943 – 30 January 1972) was a Czech figure skater who represented Czechoslovakia in pair skating and ice dancing with his sister Eva Romanová. As ice dancers, they became four-time World champions (1962–65) and two-time European champions (1964–65).

Career

The Romans started their competitive careers in pair skating rather than ice dance, placing third at the Czechoslovak Championships in 1957 and second in 1958 and 1959. They won the national ice dancing title in 1959, the first year that discipline was competed in Czechoslovakia. They competed in both disciplines at the 1959 European Championships, placing 7th in dance and 12th in pairs. After that they focused on ice dancing.

The siblings won their first world title at the 1962 World Championships in their home city of Prague, defeating their greatest rivals, Christian and Jean Paul Guhel of France. Eva was 16 years old and Pavel was 19. One year later, they won the silver medal at the 1963 European Championships, behind Linda Shearman / Michael Phillips. After this competition they won every event they entered, winning the European title in 1964 and 1965, and World titles from 1962 to 1965. Ice dancing was not yet an Olympic sport.

After retiring from competition they skated in the professional revue Holiday on Ice.

Death
Roman died in a car crash in Tennessee, five days after his 29th birthday.

Results

Pairs with Romanová

Ice dance with Romanová

References

Czechoslovak male ice dancers
Czechoslovak male pair skaters
1943 births
1972 deaths
Road incident deaths in Czechoslovakia
World Figure Skating Championships medalists
European Figure Skating Championships medalists
Articles containing video clips
Burials at Olšany Cemetery
Sportspeople from Olomouc